The RICHARD HARTMANN to ZWICKAU series of early German locomotives were express train tender locomotives operated by the Leipzig–Dresden Railway Company (Leipzig-Dresdner Eisenbahn orLDE).

History 
The three locomotives were delivered to the LDE in 1849 by Hartmann of Chemnitz with works numbers 11 to 13. They were given the names RICHARD HARTMANN, CHEMNITZ and ZWICKAU.

The engines were retired in 1865 and 1868.

Technical features 
The boiler was rivetted from several sections. The outer firebox was equipped with a semi-circular dome that extended forward over the boiler barrel and acted as a steam collection space. The two spring balance safety valves were located on the dome of the outer firebox.

The steam cylinders were located externally, unlike those on English locomotives, which avoided the need for a cranked axle that would have been expensive and difficult to manufacture. The steam engine was equipped with inside Stephenson valve gear.

The locomotives did not have their own braking equipment. Braking could only be achieved using the hand-operated screw brake on the tender.

The locomotives had Kirchweger condensers to pre-heat the feedwater. An external feature of that is the second chimney on the tender. Exhaust steam was led from the valve chest to the tender through a low-down, 100 mm, connecting pipe.

See also 
Royal Saxon State Railways
List of Saxon locomotives and railbuses
Leipzig–Dresden Railway Company

Sources 

 
 
 

2-2-2 locomotives
Locomotives of Saxony
Sächsische Maschinenfabrik locomotives
Railway locomotives introduced in 1849
Standard gauge locomotives of Germany
Passenger locomotives